This article provides details of international football games played by the Uruguay national football team from 2020 to present.

Results

2020

2021

2022

Forthcoming fixtures
No following matches are scheduled.

Notes

References

External links

Uruguay national football team
2020s in Uruguayan sport